Hypsopygia pyrerythra is a species of snout moth in the genus Hypsopygia. It was described by George Hampson in 1917. It is found in Nigeria and the Democratic Republic of the Congo.

References

Moths described in 1917
Pyralini
Moths of Africa
Insects of West Africa
Insects of the Democratic Republic of the Congo